is a  railway station in the town of Shōnai, Yamagata, Japan, operated by East Japan Railway Company (JR East).

Lines
Minamino Station is served by the Rikuu West Line, and is located 38.9 rail kilometers from the terminus of the line at Shinjō Station.

Station layout
The station has one side platform, serving a bidirectional single track. The station is unattended.

History
Minamino Station opened on May 15, 1959. The station was absorbed into the JR East network upon the privatization of JNR on April 1, 1987.

Surrounding area
The station is located in a rural area surrounded by rice fields, with few houses or commercial buildings located in the immediate vicinity.

See also
List of railway stations in Japan

External links

 JR East Station information 

Stations of East Japan Railway Company
Railway stations in Yamagata Prefecture
Rikuu West Line
Railway stations in Japan opened in 1959
Shōnai, Yamagata